The Brazil national basketball team is governed by the Brazilian Basketball Confederation, abbreviated as CBB. They have been a member of the International Federation of Basketball (FIBA), since 1935. Brazil's national basketball team remains among the most successful in the Americas. It is the only team besides the United States, that has appeared at every FIBA Basketball World Cup, since it was first held in 1950.

Throughout its history, the Brazilian national team has won two FIBA World Cup gold medals (1959 and 1963), three Summer Olympic Games bronze medals (in 1948, 1960 and 1964), four FIBA AmeriCup gold medals (1984, 1988, 2005 and 2009), and six Pan American Games gold medals (1971, 1987, 1999, 2003, 2007, and 2015).

History

First steps

Basketball was initially introduced to Brazil by Professor Augusto Shaw in 1896. In 1912, he began organizing the first state tournament and in 1922 the first national team made its debut at games against Argentina and Uruguay. As in the case of football, South America was initially ahead of the rest of the world and in 1930 held the first edition of the FIBA South American Championship. In that decade, Brazilian basketball was supported by professional football clubs, to include it as a new sports section, although amateur in nature. Later, these clubs became professional and supported the national team with world-class players.

Initial success despite budget constraints
In the following years, Brazil became a regular at major international competitions. Its basketball squad participated in the first official basketball tournament at the Summer Olympics 1936 in Berlin. In 1939, the first continental championship was held in Rio de Janeiro. In the 40s, basketball was catching on more layers of society and left the elitist stigma. The sport received the ultimate accolade at the 1948 Olympic Games in London. There, against all odds, the team directed by Moacyr Daiuto (1915–1994) managed to achieve the bronze medal. The team recorded six straight wins until it stopped due to the semi-final defeat to France (33–43). In the bronze medal match, Brazil beat Mexico (52–47). They managed to feature ten amateur players. The pre-Olympic Brazil concentration was very poor in resources. After its time-consuming journey to London, the team was astonishment when they saw how the U.S. team practiced: each player with a ball. Brazil only had two for the whole team.

The Kanela era
One of the fundamental pillars of Brazilian basketball was the boldness of its coaches. The "father" of them all is Togo Renan Soares, "Kanela" (so nicknamed for his thick white hair). Working in the shadow of the giant football, Kanela (1906–1992) understood that basketball would add more followers if it could only offer new emotions. He aimed to get the influential media involved, so the game was conceived as a spectacle based on its dynamism and aesthetics. The formula worked. Besides the national team, he coached Flamengo which chained ten titles Rio de Janeiro State Championships in a row (1951–1960). Born in João Pessoa, Paraíba, he also coached football, rowing and water polo. In his youth, he studied at a military college. His lengthy workouts alternated with authoritative teaching tone.

Rise to global dominance

The unstoppable rise of basketball was confirmed at the second World Championship in Rio (1954). The Brazilian team, coached by Kanela, reached the final undefeated and proclaimed runner-up after losing to the global hegemonic basketball power from the U.S. The Brazilian team was equipped with experienced players who won the bronze medal at the 1948 London Summer Olympic Games, and supported through the arrival of two young men. These young men were Amaury Pasos and Wlamir Marques, 18 and 17 years old, respectively. The bet of the visionary Kanela would give tremendous returns in later years.

Ironically, the Brazilian player leap happened when the team was made up of willing and enthusiastic amateurs. These athletes, who were initiated into the game almost self-taught by imitation of American basketball players who had toured the country. The hard work of Kanela consisted of giving these players basic fundamentals and then lecture them on team concepts. Amaury and Wlamir were his most successful students. Especially their jump shots dazzled at the 54 FIBA World Cup. "Their scoring was smart and technically perfect." said the Brazilian journalist Fábio Balassiano.

Before playing basketball, Amaury, who measured 1.91 m (6'3"), had practiced swimming, athletics and volleyball, which provided him with much athletic ability. Amaury began his career playing as a typical center and power forward, but he later learned to play away from the basket, as play maker. His partner, Wlamir, was another former track runner. Standing at 1.85 m (6'1"), Wlamir was a great shooter, had great ball handling skills, enormous agility and jumping ability, which also helped him to become an excellent rebounder. Amaury and Wlamir fit well into Kanela's system: fast pace, quick transition, and full confidence in the outside shooters.

After three months of intense preparation at a Marine base, Brazil was presented at the 1959 FIBA World Championship in Chile, as a candidate for the podium. In addition to the U.S. (with a team composed of air force players), a very tough opponent emerged that had been absent in the previous tournament: the Soviet Union, the 1957 EuroBasket champions and 1956 Summer Olympics silver medalists. Kanela had the following starting lineup: Amaury Pasos as play maker, Wlamir Marques and the 33-year old veteran Algodão as wings; and Waldemar Blatskauskas and Edson Bispo at power forward and center. To complete his 7-player rotation, Kanela mostly played his bench players, small forward Jatyr Schall and point guard Pecente Fonseca. There were some minutes also for the young forward Rosa Branca, who was a great ball handler, and who later received an offer to join the Harlem Globetrotters.

In the first phase, victories over Canada (69-52) and Mexico (78-50), and defeat against the USSR (64-73). Brazil began the final phase of the tournament by beating Taiwan (94-76) and Bulgaria (62-53). Again, the Brazilians ran into the Soviets (63-66) who imposed their academic style and the size of players like Jānis Krūmiņš (2.18 m). In that clash, Kanela showed his most irascible side by attacking a referee. After a new triumph over Puerto Rico (99-71), a diplomatic carom returned chance to for the title back to Brazil: the USSR, an ally of China, declined to play against Taiwan (at that time Formosa), thus losing the match. Brazil depended on itself and did not fail. Historic victory over the USA (81-67, with 26 points from Wlamir) and, on the last day, an exhibition against Chile (73-49). Brazil reached the top of world basketball. The charismatic Amaury and Wlamir caught up with Pelé and Garrincha.

Recent years
In 2012, Brazil's top players included: Anderson Varejão, Tiago Splitter, Leandro Barbosa, Nenê, Marcelinho Huertas, Alex Garcia, Guilherme Giovannoni, Marcelinho Machado, and Marquinhos Vieira. Brazil has four NBA players in 2021: Cristiano Felício (Chicago Bulls), Anderson Varejão (Cleaveland Cavaliers), Raulzinho Neto (Washington Wizards) and Didi Louzada (New Orleans Pelicans)

Competition results

Olympic Games

FIBA World Cup

Pan American Games

FIBA AmeriCup

FIBA South American Championship

Team

Current roster
Roster for the 2022 FIBA AmeriCup.

Depth chart

Past rosters
1936 Olympic Games: finished 9–14 among 23 teams

Aluízio "Baiano" Freire Ramos Accioly Neto, Américo Montanarini, Armando Albano, Ary "Pavão" dos Santos Furtado, Carmino de Pilla, Miguel Pedro, Nélson Monteiro, Waldemar "Coroa" Gonçalves (Head Coach: Arno Frank)

1948 Olympic Games: finished 3rd among 23 teams

Zenny "Algodão" de Azevedo, Ruy de Freitas, Affonso Évora, Alfredo da Motta, Marcus Vinícius, Alexandre Gemignani, Nilton Pacheco, João Francisco Bráz, Alberto Marson, Massinet Sorcinelli (Head Coach: Moacyr Brondi Daiuto)

1952 Olympic Games: finished 6th among 23 teams

Zenny "Algodão" de Azevedo, Hélio "Godinho" Marques Pereira, Tião Amorim Gimenez, Ruy de Freitas, Mayr Facci, Raymundo Carvalho dos Santos, Angelo "Angelim" Bonfietti, João Francisco Bráz, Alfredo da Motta, Almir Nelson de Almeida, Mário Jorge, Thales Monteiro, Zé Luiz (Head Coach: Manoel Pitanga)

1954 FIBA World Championship: finished 2nd among 12 teams

Amaury Pasos, Wlamir Marques, Zenny "Algodão" de Azevedo, Alfredo da Motta, Thales Monteiro, Hélio "Godinho" Marques Pereira, Ângelo "Angelim" Bonfietti, Almir Nelson de Almeida, Wilson Bombarda, Mário Jorge, Mayr Facci, José Henrique de Carli, Jamil Gedeão, Fausto Sucena Rasga Filho (Head Coach: Togo "Kanela" Renan Soares)

1956 Olympic Games: finished 6th among 15 teams

Amaury Pasos, Angelo "Angelim" Bonfietti, Edson Bispo dos Santos, Fausto Sucena Rasga Filho, Jamil Gedeão, Jorge Olivieri, Zé Luiz, Mayr Facci, Nélson Couto, Wilson Bombarda, Wlamir Marques, Zenny "Algodão" de Azevedo (Head Coach: Mário Amândio Duarte)

1959 FIBA World Championship: finished 1st among 13 teams

Amaury Pasos, Wlamir Marques, Waldemar Blatskauskas, Zenny "Algodão" de Azevedo, Edson Bispo dos Santos, Jatyr Eduardo Schall, Carmo "Rosa Branca" de Souza, Otto Nóbrega, Waldyr Geraldo Boccardo, Pedro "Pecente" Vicente da Fonseca, José "Zezinho" Maciel Senra, Fernando "Brobró" Pereira de Freitas (Head Coach: Togo "Kanela" Renan Soares)

1960 Olympic Games: finished 3rd among 16 teams

Amaury Pasos, Wlamir Marques, Waldemar Blatskauskas, Zenny "Algodão" de Azevedo, Edson Bispo dos Santos, Antônio Salvador Sucar, Carlos "Mosquito" Domingos Massoni, Carmo "Rosa Branca" de Souza, Jatyr Eduardo Schall, Moysés Blás, Waldyr Geraldo Boccardo, Fernando "Brobró" Pereira de Freitas (Head Coach: Togo "Kanela" Renan Soares)

1963 FIBA World Championship: finished 1st among 13 teams

Amaury Pasos, Bira Maciel, Wlamir Marques, Waldemar Blatskauskas, Carlos "Mosquito" Domingos Massoni, Jatyr Eduardo Schall, Carmo "Rosa Branca" de Souza, Antônio Salvador Sucar, Luiz Cláudio Menon, Friedrich "Fritz" Wilhelm Braun, Victor Mirshauswka, Benedito "Paulista" Cicero Tortelli (Head Coach: Togo "Kanela" Renan Soares)

1964 Olympic Games: finished 3rd among 16 teams

Amaury Pasos, Bira Maciel, Wlamir Marques, Edson Bispo dos Santos, Carlos "Mosquito" Domingos Massoni, Antônio Salvador Sucar, Jatyr Eduardo Schall, Carmo "Rosa Branca" de Souza, José Edvar Simões, Victor Mirshauswka, Sérgio "Macarrão" Toledo Machado, Friedrich "Fritz" Wilhelm Braun (Head Coach: Renato Brito Cunha)

1967 FIBA World Championship: finished 3rd among 13 teams

Amaury Pasos, Bira Maciel, Carlos "Mosquito" Domingos Massoni, Jatyr Eduardo Schall, Antônio Salvador Sucar, Hélio Rubens Garcia, José Edvar Simões, Sérgio "Macarrão" Toledo Machado, Luiz Cláudio Menon, José Luiz Olaio Neto, Cesar Sebba, Emil Rached (Head Coach: Togo "Kanela" Renan Soares)

1968 Olympic Games: finished 4th among 16 teams

Sérgio "Macarrão" Toledo Machado, Wlamir Marques, Bira Maciel, Celso Scarpini, Hélio Rubens Garcia, Rosa Branca, José "Joy" Aparecido, Luiz Cláudio Menon, Antônio Salvador Sucar, José Edvar Simões, Zé Geraldo, Carlos "Mosquito" Domingos Massoni (Head Coach: Renato Brito Cunha)

1970 FIBA World Championship: finished 3rd among 13 teams

José "Joy" Aparecido, Rosa Branca, Sérgio "Macarrão" Toledo Machado, José Edvar Simões, Wlamir Marques, Marquinhos Leite, Luiz Cláudio Menon, Carlos "Mosquito" Domingos Massoni, Zé Olaio, Pedro "Pedrinho" César Cardoso, Bira Maciel, Hélio Rubens Garcia (Head Coach: Togo "Kanela" Renan Soares)

1972 Olympic Games: finished 7th among 16 teams

Marquinhos Leite, Adilson Nascimento, Carlos "Mosquito" Domingos Massoni, Hélio Rubens Garcia, Zé Geraldo, José "Joy" Aparecido, Washington "Dodi" Joseph, Luiz Cláudio Menon, Radvilas Gorauskas, Fransérgio García, Bira Maciel (Head Coach: Pedro "Pedroca" Murilla Fuentes)

1974 FIBA World Championship: finished 6th among 14 teams

Bira Maciel, Carlos "Mosquito" Domingos Massoni, Marcel de Souza, Hélio Rubens Garcia, Marquinhos Leite, Adilson Nascimento, Washington "Dodi" Joseph, Zé Geraldo, Lazaro Henrique Garcia, Roberto "Robertão" José Corrêa, Milton "Carioquinha" Setrini, Luiz "Peixotinho" Carlos de Almeida Peixoto (Head Coach: Edson Bispo dos Santos)

1978 FIBA World Championship: finished 3rd among 14 teams

Oscar "Mão Santa" Schmidt, Bira Maciel, Marcel de Souza, Hélio Rubens Garcia, Marquinhos Leite, Adilson, Milton "Carioquinha" Setrini Júnior, Julio "Julinho" Garavello, Roberto "Robertão" José Corrêa, Gilson Trindade de Jesus, Eduardo Agra, Marcelo Vido, Fausto Giannechini (Head Coach: Ary Ventura Vidal)

1980 Olympic Games: finished 5th among 12 teams

André Ernesto Stoffel, Marcel de Souza, Marcelo Vido, Milton "Carioquinha" Setrini, Oscar "Mão Santa" Schmidt, Adilson Nascimento, Julio "Julinho" Garavello, Gilson Trinidade de Jesus, José Carlos Saiani, Marquinhos Leite, Ricardo "Cadum" Cardoso Guimarães, Wagner da Silva (Head Coach: Cláudio Mortari)

1982 FIBA World Championship: finished 8th among 13 teams
 
Nilo Martins Guimarães, Ricardo "Cadum" Cardoso Guimarães, André Ernesto Stoffel, Milton "Carioquinha" Setrini, Maury de Souza, Marquinhos Leite, Julio "Julinho" Garavello, Gilson Trinidade de Jesus, Marcel, Adilson Nascimento, Marcelo Vido, Oscar "Mão Santa" Schmidt, Israel Andrade (Head Coach: José Edvar Simões)

1984 Olympic Games: finished 9th among 12 teams

Gerson Victalino, Israel Andrade, Marcel de Souza, Marcelo Vido, Milton "Carioquinha" Setrini, Oscar "Mão Santa" Schmidt, Sílvio Malvezi, Adilson Nascimento, Eduardo Agra, Marquinhos Leite, Julio "Julinho" Garavello, Nilo Martins Guimarães, Ricardo "Cadum" Cardoso Guimarães (Head Coach: Renato Brito Cunha)

1986 FIBA World Championship: finished 4th among 24 teams

Nilo Martins Guimarães, Maury de Souza, Gerson Victalino, João "Pipoka" Vianna, Rolando Ferreira, Paulinho Villas Boas, Jorge "Guerrinha" Guerra, Marcel de Souza, Marcelo Vido, Sílvio Malvezi, Oscar "Mão Santa" Schmidt, Israel Andrade (Head Coach: Ary Ventura Vidal)

1988 Olympic Games: finished 5th among 12 teams

Gerson Victalino, Israel Andrade, João "Pipoka" Vianna, Jorge "Guerrinha" Guerra, Luiz Felipe, Marcel de Souza, Maury de Souza, Ricardo "Cadum" Cardoso Guimarães, Oscar "Mão Santa" Schmidt, Paulinho Villas Boas, Giant da Silva, Rolando Ferreira (Head Coach: Ary Ventura Vidal)

1990 FIBA World Championship: finished 5th among 16 teams

Luiz Felipe, Israel Andrade, Oscar "Mão Santa" Schmidt, Gerson Victalino, Fernando Minuci, Jorge "Guerrinha" Guerra, Ricardo "Cadum" Cardoso Guimarães, Aristides Josuel dos Santos, Marcel de Souza, Maury de Souza, João "Pipoka" Vianna, Rolando Ferreira (Head Coach: Hélio Rubens Garcia)

1992 Olympic Games: finished 5th among 12 teams

Aristides Josuel dos Santos, Gerson Victalino, Israel Andrade, João "Pipoka" Vianna, Jorge "Guerrinha" Guerra, Marcel de Souza, Maury de Souza, Oscar "Mão Santa" Schmidt, Paulinho Villas Boas, Rolando Ferreira, Fernando Minuci, Ricardo "Cadum" Cardoso Guimarães (Head Coach: José Medalha)

1994 FIBA World Championship: finished 11th among 16 teams

Paulinho Villas Boas, João "Pipoka" Vianna, Márcio Faria de Azevedo, Maury de Souza, Aristides Josuel dos Santos, Joélcio "Janjão" Joerke, Fernando Minuci, Rolando Ferreira, André "Ratto" Luís Guimarães Fonseca, Rogério Klafke, Carlos "Olívia" Henrique Rodrigues do Nascimento, Antônio "Tonico" José Nogueira Santana (Head Coach: Ênio Ângelo Vecchi)

1996 Olympic Games: finished 6th among 12 teams

Demétrius Conrado Ferraciú, André "Ratto" Luís Guimarães Fonseca, Caio Eduardo de Mello Cazziolato, João "Pipoka" Vianna, Carlos "Olívia" Henrique Rodrigues do Nascimento, Caio da Silveira, Antônio "Tonico" José Nogueira Santana, Fernando Minucci, Aristides Josuel dos Santos, Rogério Klafke, Oscar "Mão Santa" Schmidt, Joélcio "Janjão" Joerke (Head Coach: Ary Ventura Vidal)

1998 FIBA World Championship: finished 10th among 16 teams

Marcelinho Machado, André "Ratto" Luís Guimarães Fonseca, Caio Eduardo de Mello Cazziolato, João "Pipoka" Vianna, Sandro França Varejão, Demétrius Conrado Ferraciú, Hélio "Helinho" Rubens Garcia Filho, Marco "Chuí" Aurelio Pegolo dos Santos, Aristides Josuel dos Santos, Claudio Antonio Gomes Clemente, Rogério Klafke, Joélcio "Janjão" Joerke (Head Coach: Hélio Rubens Garcia)

2002 FIBA World Championship: finished 8th among 16 teams

Marcelinho Machado, Alex Garcia, Vanderlei Mazzuchini, Tiago Splitter, Sandro França Varejão, Demétrius Conrado Ferraciú, Hélio "Helinho" Rubens Garcia Filho, Anderson Varejão, Guilherme Giovannoni, Leandro "Leandrinho" Barbosa, Rogério Klafke, Rafael "Bábby" Araújo (Head Coach: Hélio Rubens Garcia)

2006 FIBA World Championship: finished 19th among 24 teams

Marcelinho Machado, Nezinho dos Santos, Murilo Becker, Estevam Ferreira, Leandro "Leandrinho" Barbosa, Marcelinho Huertas, Alex Garcia, Anderson Varejão, Guilherme Giovannoni, Caio Torres, Andre Bambú, Tiago Splitter (Head Coach: Lula Ferreira)

2007 FIBA Americas Championship: finished 4th among 10 teams

Marcelinho Machado, Nezinho dos Santos, Murilo Becker, Marcelinho Huertas, Alex Garcia, Valtinho da Silva, Leandro "Leandrinho" Barbosa, J. P. Batista, Guilherme Giovannoni, Nenê, Marquinhos Vieira, Tiago Splitter (Head Coach: Lula Ferreira)

2009 FIBA Americas Championship: finished 1st among 10 teams

4 – Marcelinho Machado, 5 – Duda Machado, 6 – Diego Pinheiro, 7 – Carlos Olivinha, 8 – Alex Garcia, 9 – Marcelinho Huertas, 10 – Leandrinho Barbosa, 11 – Anderson Varejão, 12 – Guilherme Giovannoni, 13 – J. P. Batista, 14 – Jonathan Tavernari, 15 – Tiago Splitter (Head Coach: Moncho Monsalve)

2010 FIBA World Championship: finished 9th among 24 teams

Marcelinho Machado, Nezinho dos Santos, Murilo Becker, Raul "Raulzinho" Neto, Alex Garcia, Marcelinho Huertas, Leandro "Leandrinho" Barbosa, Anderson Varejão, Guilherme Giovannoni, J. P. Batista, Marquinhos Vieira, Tiago Splitter (Head Coach: Rubén Magnano)

2011 FIBA Americas Championship: finished 2nd among 10 teams

4 – Marcelinho Machado, 5 – Nezinho dos Santos, 6 – Rafa Luz, 7 – Augusto Lima, 8 – Vítor Benite, 9 – Marcelinho Huertas, 10 – Alex Garcia, 11 – Rafa Hettsheimeir, 12 – Guilherme Giovannoni, 13 – Caio Torres, 14 – Marquinhos Vieira, 15 – Tiago Splitter (Head Coach: Rubén Magnano)

2012 Olympic Games: finished 5th among 12 teams

4 – Marcelinho Machado, 5 – Raul "Raulzinho" Neto, 6 – Caio Torres, 7 – Larry Taylor, 8 – Alex Garcia, 9 – Marcelinho Huertas, 10 – Leandro "Leandrinho" Barbosa, 11 – Anderson Varejão, 12 – Guilherme Giovannoni, 13 – Nenê, 14 – Marquinhos Vieira, 15 – Tiago Splitter (Head Coach: Rubén Magnano)

2013 FIBA Americas Championship: finished 9th among 10 teams
 
Arthur Luiz Belchior Silva, Rafa Luz, Raul "Raulzinho" Neto, Larry Taylor, Vítor Benite, Marcelinho Huertas, Alex Garcia, Rafa Hettsheimeir, Guilherme Giovannoni, Caio Torres, Cristiano Felício, J. P. Batista (Head Coach: Rubén Magnano)

2014 FIBA World Cup: finished 6th among 24 teams

4 – Marcelinho Machado, 5 – Raul "Raulzinho" Neto, 6 – Rafa Hettsheimeir, 7 – Larry Taylor, 8 – Alex Garcia, 9 – Marcelinho Huertas, 10 – Leandro "Leandrinho" Barbosa, 11 – Anderson Varejão, 12 – Guilherme Giovannoni, 13 – Nenê, 14 – Marquinhos Vieira, 15 – Tiago Splitter (Head Coach: Rubén Magnano)

2015 FIBA Americas Championship: finished 9th among 10 teams

Ricardo Fischer, Rafa Luz, Augusto Lima, Deryk Ramos, Vítor Benite, Léonardo Meindl, Carlos Olivinha, Rafa Mineiro, Guilherme Giovannoni, J. P. Batista, Marquinhos Vieira, Marcus Toledo (Head Coach: Rubén Magnano)

2016 Olympic Games: finished 9th among 12 teams

Raul Neto, Cristiano Felício, Vítor Benite, Alex Garcia, Marcelinho Huertas, Guilherme Giovannoni, Nenê, Rafael Hettsheimeir, Marquinhos Vieira, Leandro Barbosa, Augusto Lima, Rafa Luz (Head Coach: Rubén Magnano)

2017 FIBA AmeriCup: finished 9th among 10 teams

Davi Rossetto, Bruno Caboclo, Lucas Dias, Lucas Mariano, Danilo Siqueira, Renan Lenz, Fúlvio de Assis, Rafa Mineiro, J. P. Batista, Léonardo Meindl, Jimmy de Oliveira, Georginho de Paula (Head Coach: César Guidetti)

2019 FIBA World Cup: finished 13th among 32 teams.
The final roster was announced on 18 August 2019.

Head coaches

 Fred Charles Brown: 1930
 Ângelo Mônaco: 1934, 1940
 Arthur Silva Araújo: 1935
 Arno Frank: 1936, 1939
 Jayme da Costa Chacon: 1937–1938
 José Vaz: 1941
 Octacílio de Souza Braga: 1942–1947
 Moacyr Brondi Daiuto: 1948, 1950
 José Simões Henriques: 1949, 1953, 1955
 Togo "Kanela" Renan Soares: 1951, 1954, 1957–63, 1967, 1970–71
 Manoel Pitanga: 1952
 Ruy de Freitas: 1955
 Mário Amândio Duarte: 1956
 Renato Brito Cunha: 1964–1965, 1968, 1983–84
 Ary Ventura Vidal: 1966, 1977–79, 1985–88, 1995–96
 Édson Bispo: 1967, 1971–76
 José Fernandes Tude Sobrinho: 1969
 Pedro "Pedroca" Murilla Fuentes: 1972
 Cláudio Mortari: 1980–81
 José Edvar Simões: 1982–83
 Hélio Rubens Garcia: 1989–1990, 1997–2002
 José Medalha: 1991–92
 Ênio Ângelo Vecchi: 1993–94
 Lula Ferreira: 2003–2007
 Moncho Monsalve: 2008–2010
 Paulo Teixeira Sampaio: 2008
 João Marcelo Leite: 2010
/ Rubén Magnano: 2010–2016
 Gustavo Conti: 2012, 2016
 José Neto: 2014
 César Guidetti: 2017
 Aleksandar Petrović: 2017–2021

Kit

Manufacturer
2010–: Nike

Sponsor
2015–2016: Bradesco
2017-: Motorola
2019-: Cimed
2019-: BRB
2020-aidas

See also
Brazil men's national 3x3 team
Brazil national under-19 basketball team
Brazil national under-17 basketball team
Brazil women's national basketball team

References

External links

 
FIBA Profile
History of Brazilian basketball 
Latinbasket – Brazil Men National Team
Brazil Basketball Records at FIBA Archive
Brazil – Tournament Highlights – 2014 FIBA Basketball World Cup Youtube.com video

 
Men's national basketball teams
Basketball
1935 establishments in Brazil
Basketball teams established in 1935
Basketball in Brazil